Paris By Night 91: Huế, Sài Gòn, Hà Nội (Huế - Saigon - Hanoi) is a Paris By Night program produced by Thúy Nga that was filmed at the Terrace Theater at the Long Beach Convention and Entertainment Center on January 12, 2008 and January 13, 2008.

Concept

The program features songs, musicals and as well as a skit that characterize the three main cities of Vietnam, which are Huế, Sài Gòn and Hà Nội.  Each city represents its respective region of the country.  Hà Nội represents the North Vietnam. Huế represents the Central Vietnam.  Sài Gòn represents the South Vietnam.  Each city carries its own tradition as well as characteristics that set it apart from one another.  As a whole, the cultures of Huế, Sài Gòn and Hà Nội complement each other to visualize a complete Việt Nam. The musical “Huế Mậu Thân” poignantly depicts the Massacre at Huế perpetrated by the communists in 1968 during the Tet Offensive.

Special guests included Hưng Huỳnh, who was the winner of Top Chef Season 3), Khải (a Dutch Pennsylvanian who spoke Vietnamese), Deputy Director Hồ Văn Kỳ Thoại (Phó Đề Đốc Hồ Văn Kỳ Thoại), and Former Deputy Nguyễn Lý Tưởng (Cựu Dân Biểu Nguyễn Lý Tưởng).

Track list

Disc 1

 Opening Clip (Phần Mở Đầu): Từ Miền Bắc
 Trích Đoạn: "Con Đường Cái Quan: Từ Miền Bắc" (Phạm Duy) –  Thế Sơn, Bằng Kiều, Quang Lê, Trần Thái Hòa, Dương Triệu Vũ & Trịnh Lam, Quỳnh Vi
 Giấc Mơ Hồi Hương (Vũ Thành) – Khánh Hà
 Hà Nội Ngày Trở Về (Phú Quang, Lời: Doãn Thanh Tùng & Phú Quang) – Quang Dũng
 Em Đi Chùa Hương (Trung Đức & Thơ: Nguyễn Nhược Pháp) – Tú Quyên & Thanh Trúc
 Hà Nội Mùa Vắng Những Cơn Mưa (Trương Quý Hải, Thơ: Bùi Thanh Tuấn) – Thế Sơn
 Video Clip: Nhạc Sĩ Hoàng Dương
 Hướng Về Hà Nội (Hoàng Dương) – Thu Phương
 Em Ơi Hà Nội Phố (Phú Quang, phỏng thơ: Phan Vũ) - Bằng Kiều
 Phỏng Vấn: Mr. Khải
 Video Clip: Qua Miền Trung
 Trích Đoạn: "Con Đường Cái Quan: Qua Miền Trung" (Phạm Duy) – Trần Thái Hòa, Dương Triệu Vũ, Trịnh Lam, Nguyễn Hoàng Nam, Lưu Việt Hùng, & Mai Thiên Vân
 Tâm Tình Gửi Huế (Tôn Nữ Trà Mi & Hoàng Thi Thơ) – Họa Mi & Trở Về Huế (Văn Phụng) – Ý Lan
 Bao Giờ Em Quên (Duy Khánh) – Mai Quốc Huy
 Thương Về Xứ Huế (Minh Kỳ) – Hoàng Oanh & Hà Thanh
 Phỏng Vấn: Mai Thiên Vân
 Tiếng Sông Hương (Phạm Đinh Chương) – Mai Thiên Vân
 Video Clip: Nhạc Sĩ Châu Kỳ
 Trở Về (Châu Kỳ) – Trần Thái Hòa
 Video Clip: Nhạc Sĩ Thăng Long
 Quen Nhau Trên Đường Về (Thăng Long) – Quỳnh Dung & Duy Trường
 Phỏng Vấn: Cựu Dân Biểu Nguyễn Lý Tưởng

Disc 2

 Giới Thiệu Nhạc Kịch: "Huế Mậu Thân"
 Nhạc Kịch: "Huế Mậu Thân"
Những Con Đường Trắng (Trầm Tử Thiêng & Tô Kiều Ngân) – Quang Lê
Bài Ca Dành Cho Những Xác Người (Trịnh Công Sơn) – Khánh Ly
 Phỏng Vấn (interview): Phó Đề Đốc Hồ Văn Kỳ Thoại
 Hài Kịch: Chung Một Mái Nhà – Chí Tài, Hương Thủy, Bé Ti & Uyên Chi
 Video Clip: Top Chef Hưng Huỳnh
 Phỏng Vấn: Top Chef Hưng Huỳnh
 Video Clip: Vào Miền Nam
 Trích Đoạn: "Con Đường Cái Quan: Vào Miền Nam" – Hương Thủy, Thế Sơn, Quang Lê, Nguyễn Hoàng Nam, & Lưu Việt Hùng
 Video Clip: Soạn Giả Viễn Châu
 Tân Cổ: Tiếng Hò Miền Nam (Tân Nhạc: Phạm Duy & Cổ Nhạc: Viễn Châu) – Hương Lan & Minh Vương
 Đêm Đô Thị (Y Vân) & Sài Gòn (Y Vân) – Bảo Hân, Hồ Lệ Thu & Thùy Vân
 Phỏng Vấn: Mr. Khải
 Bước Chân Chiều Chủ Nhật (Đỗ Kim Bảng) – Ngọc Liên & Đêm Lang Thang (Vinh Sử) – Dương Trieu Vu
 Sài Gòn Niềm Thương Nỗi Nhớ (Nhạc: Võ Tá Hân & Thơ: Trần Ngọc) – Trịnh Lam
 Giòng An Giang (Anh Việt Thu) – Quỳnh Vi & Nguyệt Ánh
 Phỏng Vấn: Bằng Kiều
 Sài Gòn Chiều Bơ Vơ © (Thái Thịnh) – Minh Tuyết
 Tự Tình Quê Hương © (Nhật Ngân & Trịnh Việt Cường) – Tâm Đoan
 Tôi Yêu (Trịnh Hưng) – Hồ Lệ Thu, Thanh Trúc & Như Loan
 Finale

Bonus video: Huế Mậu Thân
Hậu Trường Sân Khấu (Behind The Scenes)

Paris by Night

vi:Paris By Night 91